This is a list of current governments.

National governments

Sub-national and supranational governments

See also 

 List of current heads of state and government
 List of current heads of government in the United Kingdom and dependencies
 List of national governments

References 

Lists of current office-holders